MS-DOS 7 is a real mode operating system for IBM PC compatibles. Unlike earlier versions of MS-DOS it was not released separately by Microsoft, but included in the Windows 9x family of operating systems. Windows 95 RTM reports to be MS-DOS 7.0, while Windows 95 OSR 2.x and Windows 98 report as 7.1. Windows 9x runs under DOS similar to Windows 3.1x, and while according to Microsoft the role of MS-DOS was reduced to a bootloader and acted as the 16-bit legacy device driver layer, it has been stated that there is almost no difference in the relationship between Windows 9x and its included MS-DOS 7.x and Windows 3.x and MS-DOS 6.x. The real-mode MS-DOS 7.x operating system is contained in the IO.SYS file.

New features
As the first version in the series, MS-DOS 7.0 added support for long filename (LFN) awareness, and its DIR command for example will show them with an LFN driver such as DOSLFN (earlier versions of MS-DOS wouldn’t show long filenames even with such a driver). It also supports for larger extended memory (up to 4GB) via its HIMEM.SYS driver. Various smaller improvements are also introduced, such as enhanced DOS commands, more efficient use of UMB memory (COMMAND.COM and part of the DOS kernel are loaded high automatically), and the fact that environment variables can be used in the DOS command line directly.

MS-DOS 7.1 added FAT32 support (up to 2TB per volume), while MS-DOS 7.0 and earlier versions of MS-DOS only supported FAT12 and FAT16. Logical block addressing (LBA) is also supported in MS-DOS 7.1 for accessing large hard disks, unlike earlier versions which only supported cylinder-head-sector (CHS)-based addressing. Year 2000 support was added to DIR command via the new /4 option.

MS-DOS 7.x added support for running the graphical interface of Windows 9x, which cannot be run on older MS-DOS releases. Even though VER command usually shows the Windows version, the MS-DOS version is also officially mentioned in other places. For example, if one attempts to run Windows 95 OSR2 or Windows 98’s VMM32.VXD file (renamed to VMM32.EXE) directly from an earlier version of MS-DOS, the following message will be immediately displayed:

Cannot run Windows with the installed version of MS-DOS.
Upgrade MS-DOS to version 7.1 or higher.

In the case of Windows 95 RTM, the version number 7.0 is displayed in place of 7.1.

More information
A major difference between earlier versions of MS-DOS is the usage of the MSDOS.SYS file. In version 7 this is not a binary file, but a pure setting file. The older boot style, where Windows is not automatically started and the system boots into a DOS command shell, could keep on using that same style by setting BootGUI=0 in the MSDOS.SYS file. Otherwise, Windows from Windows 95 onward will automatically start up on boot. However this was in reality only an automatic call for the command WIN.COM, the Windows starting program. Windows 95 and 98 are both dependent on MS-DOS to boot the 32-bit kernel and to run legacy 16-bit MS-DOS device drivers, although MS-DOS 7 possibly is more "hidden" than earlier versions of MS-DOS. This is also true for Windows Me, but Me prevents users from booting MS-DOS without booting the 32-bit Windows kernel. 
    
Also the paths for (a plausible but actually not necessary) Windows directory and Boot directory are to be set in this new version of the MSDOS.SYS file. Whilst IO.SYS (although binary different) remained as the initial executive startup file which BIOS booting routines fire up, if located correctly. Also the COMMAND.COM file implements the command prompt. The typical DOS setting files CONFIG.SYS and AUTOEXEC.BAT essentially retained their functions from earlier versions of MS-DOS (although memory allocation was no longer needed).

Although only included in Windows releases (the last official standalone release of MS-DOS ever was version 6.22), MS-DOS 7.x can fairly easily be extracted from Windows 95/98, and be used alone on other computers, just as the earlier versions. Actually MS-DOS 7.x works fine on many modern (as of 2016) motherboards (at least with PS2-keyboards), in sharp contrast to Windows 95/98. It has to be installed on an FAT partition, and in the case of MS-DOS 7.0 the partition must be located at "the top" of the hard drive and formatted as FAT12 or FAT16. Another difference is that MS-DOS 7.x requires a 80386 or higher processor, it fails to boot on 80286-class or lower x86 hardware.

For manual installation, MS-DOS 7.x can be installed through the SYS command (executing the SYS.COM file), for example from a folder on a Ramdrive created by a bootable disc. Correct versions of IO.SYS (especially) must exist in the same folder as SYS.COM together with MSDOS.SYS and COMMAND.COM (and optionally DRVSPACE.BIN, CONFIG.SYS, and AUTOEXEC.BAT). All other files can be copied thereafter. (In Windows 95/98 they are found in either the root folder or in the C:\WINDOWS\COMMAND folder)

See also

 PC DOS 7
 List of DOS commands
 List of DOS system files
 Timeline of DOS operating systems

References

Further reading

Notes
A.There was a “MS-DOS 7.1” made by China DOS Union, which is the same as the Windows 9x version, but bundled as a standalone OS with a multitude of utilities. Source: WinWorld.
"MS-DOSx86 used to create MS-DOS 7.1"

Disk operating systems
Proprietary operating systems
1995 software
Discontinued Windows components
Discontinued Microsoft operating systems